1992 Emmy Awards may refer to:

 44th Primetime Emmy Awards, the 1992 Emmy Awards ceremony honoring primetime programming
 19th Daytime Emmy Awards, the 1992 Emmy Awards ceremony honoring daytime programming
 20th International Emmy Awards, the 1992 Emmy Awards ceremony honoring international programming

Emmy Award ceremonies by year